The High Commissioner of France in the Levant, named after 1941 the General Delegate of Free France in the Levant, was the highest ranking authority representing France in the French-mandated countries of Syria and Lebanon. Its office was based in Beirut, Lebanon.

List of High Commissioners of France in the Levant

List of General Delegates of Free France in the Levant

See also
Mandate for Syria and the Lebanon

References

World Statesmen – Syria

Syria diplomacy-related lists
Lebanon diplomacy-related lists
France diplomacy-related lists
 
French Mandate for Syria and the Lebanon